Adrian Picardi (born April 1987) is an American filmmaker originally from South Pasadena, California. For all his works thus far, he has been credited as director, writer, cinematographer, and Film editor. He got his start in the industry by creating the television series The Resistance for the STARZ / SyFy Network produced by Sam Raimi's Ghost House Pictures. Picardi graduated from South Pasadena High School in 2005, and then graduated from the Los Angeles Film School in 2006. Currently, Picardi runs a production company named Aureus Grex, based out of Glendale, CA and is represented under Brawler. Picardi has helmed commercial spots for PlayStation, Microsoft, Xbox, and Tom Clancy's The Division.

Biography

Career
Picardi graduated from the Los Angeles Film School in 2006 at the age of 19 and jumped into the industry as an editor for Television.  Picardi continued to pursue his directing career by independently producing his own projects.  In 2007, Picardi created a short film called "His Day to Remember," which was the Grand Prize Winner in the Cinematic Film2Music online competition.  Using the raw, percussive chant-driven track "Steel & Sky," he created a visually compelling drama about a young man who is apparently a suicide bomber.

The film was also screened at the Sundance Film Festival 2007 and got him featured on MTVu.com as "Best Filmmaker on Campus" in December 2007. Additionally, In 2007, he won the "Audience Award" for Myspace's John Woo Film Tribute contest for the Chow Yun-fat videogame "Stranglehold". For his second short, "His Final Hit", it placed into the top ten finalists of the IFC Film "Assassin's Creed" Film Contest.

Soon after, Picardi and his team created a low budget web series called "The Resistance" which started off as 4 short online teasers featured on YouTube. Before filming the actual web show, the series was picked up by Sam Raimi’s Ghost House Pictures and Starz Media, after executives at Starz and Ghost House viewed "The Resistance" teasers online. The web show aired on October 4, 2010, on the SyFy channel as a one-hour television pilot along with being released in its original 8 episodic form on iTunes, Xbox Live, and the PlayStation Network.  "The Resistance" is executive produced by Ben Ketai, Scott Bayless, Scott Rogers, with producers Aaron Lam, and Associate Producer Don Le. The pilot will reportedly make history, as it's the first time a series created originally for the web will first premiere on television.

Picardi won the Universal Music / Decca Records online music video contest hosted by Talenthouse, for the band ERA, . He also took home the Grand Prize award for the New York Times best-selling author Scott Sigler’s "Ancestor" film contest. He also wrapped two more music videos, one for the band Automatic Love Letter and Sony Music Entertainment / Epic Records, and another for the band Evans Blue.

2012–present

In 2012, Picardi and Airsoft GI created a fan film based on the videogame series Left 4 Dead.  Within 4 days of releasing the initial teaser, the clip amassed over 2.5 million views and massive buzz online, including outlets such as PC Gamer, Complex, Game Informer, and Valve (creators of the game itself).

In early 2013, Picardi had created a production company Aureus Grex alongside his long time best friend, Sunny Jain.

In 2016, Aureus Grex and Corridor Digital teamed up to release a series of live-action spots for Ubisoft and Tom Clancy's The Division entitled Agent Origins. Picardi directed, shot, and edited three of the four episodes titled Escape, Ashes, and Conspiracies.

Currently Picardi is developing two feature films, as well as a project with Warner Brother's digital arm, Blue Ribbon Content.

Filmography

References

https://web.archive.org/web/20100510083333/http://www.chicagonow.com/blogs/show-patrol/2010/04/somebody-to-watch-katrina-laws-ready-for-more-spartacus.html
http://news.tubefilter.tv/2010/09/17/the-resistance-debuts-on-syfy-first-internet-second/
https://web.archive.org/web/20110708154225/http://www.cinematiccd.com/films/trackindex8.html
https://web.archive.org/web/20091016093814/http://blog.memelabs.com/memelabs-is-famous/
https://web.archive.org/web/20110723223307/http://www.mtvu.com/video/?id=1575024&vid=191296
https://www.myspace.com/strangleholdgame
https://web.archive.org/web/20110726102445/http://www.gigslist.org/index.php?name=News&file=article&sid=85
https://www.youtube.com/swifferbreakup

External links
 
 Official "The Resistance" Series Website
 Company Site
 Twitter
 Youtube

Living people
1987 births
American filmmakers